Edwin Cox may refer to:

 Edwin L. Cox, American businessman and philanthropist
 Edwin P. Cox (1870–1938), American politician in the Virginia House of Delegates
 Edwin Charles Cox (1868–1958), British soldier and railway manager
 Edwin Thoms Cox (1881–1967), mayor of Dunedin